Granik is a surname. Notable people with the surname include:

 Debra Granik (born 1963), American filmmaker
 Russ Granik, American sports executive

See also
 Granit (name)